James McDonald Gardiner (May 22, 1857 – November 25, 1925) was an American architect, lay Anglican church missionary and educator who lived and worked in Japan during the Meiji period.

Early life and education
Born May 22, 1857 in St. Louis, Missouri, son of James McDonald and Margaret McCartney (Gordon) Gardiner. Educated at Hackensack Academy and Harvard University graduating with a degree in architecture in 1879.

Mission work and architectural career in Japan
Gardiner first came to Japan in 1880 and designed numerous school, church and private residential buildings while in the country. As a lay missionary in the Anglican Church in Japan his connection with Bishop Channing Moore Williams and the work of US Episcopal Church mission was close, leading in part to his appointment as one of the first Presidents of St. Paul's School, the founding institution of Rikkyo University.

Gardiner's first task on arrival in Japan was to design and supervise the construction of new school and dormitory facilities for St. Paul's School in Tsukiji, Tokyo. The three-story, red brick, school buildings in an American Victorian Gothic style were completed in 1881, but suffered significant damage in an earthquake in 1894. Gardiner was also responsible for the design of adjacent Holy Trinity Cathedral, completed in 1890, which served as the center of Episcopal Church mission activity in the city.

Other than St. Agnes Cathedral (Kyoto), other buildings of note designed by Gardiner and still preserved in Japan include St. John's Church, Kyoto (1907), now in the historic building collection at Meiji-mura, and the former residence of Sadatsuchi Uchida, known as The Diplomat's House (1910), since 1995 a feature of the Italian Garden park in Yamate, Yokohama. Additionally, Ascension Church in Hirosaki, Aomori Prefecture, completed in 1921.

Grave located at the True Light Church, Nikkō, Tochigi, Japan; an Anglican church of his own design.

Gallery

Family
Married Florence Rhodes Pitman, Principal of St. Margaret's School for Girls, Tokyo in 1882. One son; James Lawrence McDonald Gardiner and Three daughters; Hasu no Hana, Ernestine and Lillian.  
 Eldest daughter, Hasu no Hana, married Episcopal missionary, Shirley Hall Nichols in 1916.  In 1925 Nichols was elected to serve as the Episcopal Bishop of Kyoto.

References

See also
 Rikkyo University
 Meiji-mura

19th-century American architects
Foreign educators in Japan
Harvard University alumni
1857 births
1925 deaths
20th-century American architects
American emigrants to Japan